The Battle of Asfeld was fought in 552 between the Lombards and the Gepids. The Lombards, led by King Audoin (with the help of his brother-in-law Amalafrid), were victorious, and, Turismod, the son of King Thorisind, was slain in the battle.

See also
Lombard–Gepid War (567)

Sources

Asfeld
Asfeld
Asfeld
552
Gepids